Shawn Maldonado (born 1986) is an American right-handed professional ten-pin bowler from Houston, Texas, who joined the Professional Bowlers Association in 2013. He owns two national PBA Tour titles, and has also won 15 PBA Regional Tour titles.

Maldonado uses a two-handed shovel-style delivery. Unusual for this style, he originally put his thumb in the ball. However, he converted to a no-thumb delivery in October 2020.

Maldonado is a national pro staff member for Hammer Bowling, after previously being sponsored by Storm. He is also sponsored by VISE Grips.

Personal life 
Maldonado was born in 1986 in Houston, Texas. He started bowling at the age of two. His parents used to bowl on a league three or more nights a week, so he was introduced to bowling at a very young age. Similar to Jason Belmonte's starting story, the bowling balls were too heavy for him to lift with one hand on his own, so he learned to use two hands to bowl, and used a thirteen-step approach.

Maldonado is married and has four kids, Dominic, Mia, Shawn Jr (SJ), and Ace.  Outside of bowling, he enjoys watching his son play baseball, while Shawn himself likes exercising and playing Chess, Billiards, Dominoes, Backgammon, Basketball and Tennis. Being born in Houston, he is a big fan of all Houston sports teams. His favorite food is Italian.

Professional career 
Maldonado joined the PBA in 2013, but did not participate full-time on the PBA Tour until the 2015 season, during which he made his first two televised finals appearances.

He broke through with his first national PBA title in the 2021 PBA Chameleon Championship, part of that season's PBA World Series of Bowling. He later won the 2021 PBA Lubbock Sports Open.

Maldonado had a third-place finish in the 2022 PBA Tournament of Champions. He qualified as the #15 seed for the 2022 PBA Playoffs. After an upset win over #2 seed Anthony Simonsen in the opening round, he was defeated by tenth-seeded A. J. Johnson in the quarterfinals. 

At the 2023 PBA Dave Small's Jackson Classic, Maldonado made the stepladder finals (broadcast on BowlTV) and rolled the first 11 strikes in his opening match before leaving two pins with a light hit on his final shot for a 298 game. He would lose the semifinal match to eventual winner E. J. Tackett to finish in third place.

Maldonado has earned over $300,000 in PBA events.

Accomplishments and honors 
 2x Texas Masters champion
 13 PBA Regional titles
 2014 and 2015 PBA Southwest Region Player of the Year
 2016 PBA Elias Cup Champion with the Dallas Strikers (PBA League team)
 2021 PBA Chameleon Championship winner
 2021 PBA Lubbock Sports Open winner

References

Living people
1986 births